Richard Henry Alvey (March 6, 1826 – September 14, 1906), frequently known as R. H. Alvey, was an American jurist who served as chief judge of the supreme court of the State of Maryland, the Maryland Court of Appeals and subsequently served as the chief justice of the Court of Appeals of the District of Columbia.

Education and career

Alvey was born in St. Mary's County, Maryland, to George and Harriet Wicklin Alvey. He read law and was admitted to the bar in 1849, and began private practice in Hagerstown, Maryland the next year. From 1844 to 1850, Alvey served as a deputy within the clerk's office of Charles County, Maryland. He was a Presidential Elector from the state of Maryland during the election of 1852. In 1861, At the outbreak of the American Civil War, he authored the Alvey Resolution, which took a strong position in favor of states' rights. As a southern sympathizer, Alvey was arrested by Union soldiers and detained.

After the Civil War, Alvey served as a delegate to the Maryland Constitutional Convention of 1867, where he was Chairman of the Committee on Representation. That same year he was a member of the Maryland General Assembly, was appointed to the Maryland Court of Appeals as an associate judge, and also as chief judge of the Fourth Judicial Circuit of Washington, Allegany, and Garrett Counties. He served in that position until 1883, when he accepted a federal judicial post.

Federal judicial service

Alvey was nominated by President Grover Cleveland on April 14, 1893, to the Court of Appeals of the District of Columbia (now the United States Court of Appeals for the District of Columbia Circuit), to the new Chief Justice seat authorized by 27 Stat. 434. He was confirmed by the United States Senate on April 15, 1893, and received his commission the same day. His service terminated on January 1, 1905, due to his retirement.

Other service

In 1896, as Chief Justice, Alvey served as a member of an American commission tasked with resolving a boundary dispute between Venezuela and British Guiana. He also served as chancellor of National University (now George Washington University) in Washington, D.C. from 1897 to 1904.

Family

Alvey married Mary Wharton in 1856, with whom he had one child. After her death in 1860, Alvey remarried to Julia Jones Hays in 1862, with whom he had nine children. Alvey died on September 14, 1906, in Hagerstown. He was grandson of John Alvey and a descendant of John Alvey, a Revolutionary soldier in the Maryland line.

References

Sources
 Biography from the Maryland Archives

External links

 Men of Mark in America Biography
 

Chief Judges of the Maryland Court of Appeals
Judges of the United States Court of Appeals for the D.C. Circuit
People from St. Mary's County, Maryland
Maryland lawyers
People of Maryland in the American Civil War
1826 births
1906 deaths
United States federal judges appointed by Grover Cleveland
19th-century American judges
Politicians from Hagerstown, Maryland
United States federal judges admitted to the practice of law by reading law